Philip Stuart Pickett (born  19 November 1946) is an English songwriter, musician, vocal arranger, producer and artist manager.

He is principally known as a songwriter and musician and for co-writing and recording "Karma Chameleon", one of the biggest hits of the 1980s era with
Boy George and Culture Club during his tenure as keyboard player and backing vocalist for the group on every live performance throughout the world during the 1980s. Prior to this, Pickett co-founded hit-making pop band Sailor in 1973 which achieved considerable chart-topping success in the mid-1970s glam rock period and with whom he still regularly performs to the present day. Pickett's songs have also been recorded by many other artists including Labi Siffre, Sheena Easton, Georgie Fame, Joe Cocker, Brian Kennedy and Malcolm McLaren, used in countless TV commercials and included in the soundtrack of Hollywood films Electric Dreams, Top Secret!, The Lost Boys and his West End Musical Theatre debut, Casper The Musical.

Early years
Pickett was born on 19 November 1946 in Münster, Germany (B.A.O.R.), the only child of father Philip George Pickett, an RAF pilot officer killed in a flying accident in Rhodesia in 1950 and mother Eileen Elizabeth Pickett who died in Spain in 1993.

Upon leaving school at Sutton Coldfield near Birmingham, England, in 1964, Phil took the advice of a family mentor, Philip Sutton, a director of Garfield Weston's Associated British Foods, by choosing to take an apprenticeship in the bakery industry, but by this time was also immersing himself in a growing passion and talent for musical composition. An interest in American music, particularly R&B, led him to form his first band, "The Blues Unit" with some school and college friends. After completing his apprenticeship on his 21st birthday, whilst taking a 12-month sabbatical travelling across the US, Pickett enjoyed a brief but life-changing chance encounter with legendary jazz musician Duke Ellington in a North Beach supper club in San Francisco, who whilst raising a glass to the young man, strongly advised him to "follow his heart" and return to England to pursue a music career instead.

Music career 1969–1973

Upon hearing an early arrangement of an obscure Peter, Paul and Mary album track, the then relatively unknown "Leaving on a Jet Plane" that Pickett had curated and was now performing with his folk singing partner Paddy Maguire at "Mother's" in Erdington 1968, Warner Bros executives Ian Ralfini and Martin Wyatt arriving from London to audition the duo and realising the track was already published by Warners, released it a few weeks later and the song went straight to No. 1 in the UK chart staying there for several weeks.

Moving to London in 1969, Phil was employed as an arranger by E. H. Morris, a US music publisher based in Hanover Square W1 with the added responsibility of sifting through the many tapes sent in by hopeful writers. One of the songwriters was Norwegian guitarist / vocalist, Georg Kajanus, who after being recommended to the publisher, Phil contacted with a view to forming a group. The duo, now called "Kajanus Pickett" recorded an album of self-composed material, "Hi-Ho Silver" for Arty Mogul's Signpost label, an imprint of Atlantic Records. Around this period Pickett also worked with Vanda and Young, playing on many of their early tracks and also wrote a number of songs with Scott English and B. A. Robertson, all of them E. H. Morris songwriters in the late 1960s/early '70s. One of his songs, "Lay Me Down" was recorded by Georgie Fame – Pickett's first significant 'cover' recording.

Sailor, 1973–

Although the "Kajanus Pickett" L.P. achieved fairly limited success upon release, in 1973 Pickett co-founded pop band Sailor with Kajanus with the addition of keyboard player, Henry Marsh, and drummer, Grant Serpell. Sailor recorded a total of 10 albums throughout their career achieving considerable UK and international success during the early to mid-1970s with a number of hit singles produced by Jeffrey Lesser and Rupert Holmes, most notably "A Glass of Champagne" and 'Girls Girls Girls' – the former hit dislodging Queen's "Bohemian Rhapsody" at the UK No. 1 spot in the NME chart in 1976 after having resided at the No. 2 slot for several weeks. (Thirty years on, in 2006, 'Champagne' was again heavily featured, this time in a TV advertising campaign for Marks and Spencer accompanied by some of the world's top supermodels and widely attributed as a major contributory factor in the High Street retailer's successful renaissance and rebranding exercise.) The band topped the charts all over Europe in the 1970s earning many gold albums and sell-out tours with a reputation for extravagantly unique and theatrical productions. The group also frequently appeared on the BBC's iconic Top of the Pops TV show and Mike Mansfield's Supersonic on LWT together with their many overseas equivalents.

Kajanus eventually left the group in 1978 with Pickett taking up the reins of Sailor by recording Dressed for Drowning (Epic/ Caribou) an album predominantly written by him and produced by US record producer James William Guercio at his famous Caribou Ranch Studios in Colorado in 1979. This incarnation featured Phil's bandmate Henry Marsh and newcomers, brother and sister duo, Virginia (Ginny) and Gavin David, Serpell having left to become a teacher. In a Playboy interview at the time, the Beach Boys' Carl Wilson, who later sang with Pickett on one of the Caribou recordings ("Whatever's in Your Heart") named Dressed For Drowning  his favourite album of that year (1980). Another of his songs, "Don't Send Flowers" was covered by Sheena Easton as the opening track of her debut triple-platinum album Take My Time considerably adding to Pickett's growing reputation as a pop songwriter in that year.

In 1993, Pickett whilst attending meetings in Germany, was approached by pop impresario/ promoter, Rainer Haas with a view to reform the original line-up of Sailor; Georg Kajanus, Grant Serpell, Henry Marsh and himself to perform a series of concert tours throughout Germany and Austria. Upon agreement to the generous terms negotiated by Pickett, the band were immediately signed up by Haas to play 100 concerts during 1993–94 and performed their music to bigger audiences than in their entire hit-making career throughout the early to mid-1970s. Sailor were unique amongst their erstwhile contemporaries for (a) being a 100% original line-up and, (b) for recording two new contemporary hits in Benelux and Germany in the 1990s – "The Secretary" and "La Cumbia" (These tracks were recorded on an earlier recording project for BMG on two albums, Sailor and Streetlamp for which Kajanus composed all the material, as in earlier years a pre-condition of his involvement in recording).

Sailor's music catalogue is still controlled by the band's first manager, Steve Morris, son of the late E. H. (Buddy) Morris to the present day through his company Sashay Music.

In 1995, Kajanus retired from live performance, his place being taken up by lead guitarist/vocalist Peter Lincoln. Grant Serpell retired in 2011 and was replaced by Henry Marsh's son Thomas Marsh. Peter Lincoln left to join The Sweet in 2006 and was replaced by Oliver Marsh, Henry's younger son on lead vocals and guitar. Sailor still perform fairly regularly, mainly in Germany, Benelux and Scandinavia with Pickett having so far played on every live performance with the band since 1973 to the present day.

Culture Club / Boy George 1982–86

On returning to England from the US in 1982 Pickett, by now in demand as a session player and arranger, joined Boy George's band, Culture Club on keyboards and backing vocals initially co-writing "It's a Miracle" and "Karma Chameleon". The latter song, according to Sir Richard Branson (in Losing My Virginity) to whom his label Culture Club were signed "Became Number 1 in every country in the world that had a chart, selling 1.4 million records in the UK alone." This earned Phil two Ivor Novello Awards, possibly the music industry's most prestigious songwriting award in 1983 – for "Best Pop Song" and "Highest-Selling A-side". Pickett played extensively on all of the band's records throughout this period and also co-wrote many other songs with the band including Move Away produced by Arif Mardin which in 1986 climbed to Number 7 in the US Billboard chart before the lead singer's drugs conviction in the UK which eclipsed the band's career and prospects for several years afterwards.

However Phil composed a number of other songs with Boy George prior to this period including the title track of the movie Electric Dreams sung by P.P. Arnold and "How Silly Can You Get" sung by Val Kilmer debuting in the Zucker Brothers' Top Secret! "Karma Chameleon" is currently heavily featured in Boy George's new production of the Taboo musical in London's West End (2013) and the track is consistently employed as a ubiquitous 1980s presence in countless Hollywood movie soundtracks and TV advertising campaigns throughout the world.

Other projects and management

Pickett recorded the 1984 Olympic Games theme song, Destiny with MCA. Jon Moss from Culture Club contributed with drums and the single cover was created by fashion illustrator Tony Viramontes.

In 1989, Pickett discovered charismatic Nigerian singer songwriter Keziah Jones busking in Portobello Road London, a relationship that soon evolved into management. After considerable initial success, the two parted company in 1994 but are back together again 17 years on, when the by now highly successful performer and recording artist approached Phil in 2010 for exclusive representation a second time around. Phil's management company, Rugged Management LLP now manages Keziah and a few other selected artists and projects.

Phil Pickett was actively involved in the successful PPL campaign for the 'Extension of Copyright Term' from 50 to 70 years recently where on behalf of the PPL and the Musicians Union he gave a speech at the Houses of Parliament in 2009 in front of MP's journalists and government ministers. More recently, in 2012 he was voted on to the board at B.A.S.C.A. (The British Academy of Songwriters, Composers and Authors) and as a previous Ivor winner, is currently involved in helping to set up a contemporary televised national songwriting competition. In December 2012 Phil Pickett signed a long term administration / publishing deal for his back catalogue and current and future songs with Imagem Music Publishers / Boosey and Hawkes.

Throughout a long career in the music industry, Phil Pickett has also been associated with a huge variety of artists, writers and producers including Phil Ramone, Quincy Jones, Arif Mardin, Stewart Levine, Paul McCartney, Joe Cocker, Jeff Beck, Take That, Malcolm McLaren and has written songs for West End musical theatre Casper & The Mask and Hollywood movies, including Electric Dreams Top Secret! and The Lost Boys

In July 2015, Phil Pickett was invited to join the songwriting fraternity - The Society Of Distinguished Songwriters or "S.O.D's" as they are commonly known in the business. Other members include Sir Tim Rice, Justin Hayward, Mike Batt, Gary Barlow and Björn Ulvaeus.

References
 
"A Glass of Champagne-The Official Sailor Story" by James McCarraher published by Sarum
"Losing My Virginity" by Sir Richard Branson published by Crown Publishing Group
"Take It Like a Man" by Boy George and Spencer Bright published by Harper Collins
Wikipedia Culture Club ""The song ("Electric Dreams") was written with Phil Pickett (former member of the 1970s band Sailor) who had also co-written "Karma Chameleon" and frequently played keyboards for the group. Also "At the 1984 Brit Awards the band won two awards: Best *British Group, and Best British Single ("Karma Chameleon")
http://www.songfacts.com/detail.php?id=5775
BASCA Ivor Novello Award Recipients 1983 "Karma Chameleon" Winner Best Song Musically and Lyrically and Highest Selling A-Side

English music managers
English new wave musicians
English songwriters
Living people
1946 births